The Kizlyarsky otdel was a Cossack district (otdel) of the Terek oblast of the Caucasus Viceroyalty of the Russian Empire. The area of the Kizlyarsky otdel makes up part of the North Caucasian Federal District of Russia. The district was eponymously named for its administrative center, Kizlyar.

Administrative divisions 
The subcounties (uchastoks) of the Kizlyarsky otdel were as follows:

Demographics

Russian Empire Census 
The majority of the population indicated Russian to be their mother tongue, with a significant Nogai speaking minority.

Kavkazskiy kalendar 

Notes

References

Bibliography 

Otdels of Terek Oblast